The Adams County Courthouse is a three-story brick courthouse building in Hettinger, North Dakota.  Built in 1928, it was designed by Ira Rush, an architect who won competitions for design of several other courthouses in the state.  The design of this one had elements of Art Deco, but appears to have been limited by budget to a more economical design.

There was a wood-frame courthouse and a sheriff's house east of the location from 1907; this building was built in 1928 and those buildings were removed by the 1960s.  It was built by contractor Fred R. Comb.

References

Courthouses on the National Register of Historic Places in North Dakota
County courthouses in North Dakota
Art Deco architecture in North Dakota
Government buildings completed in 1928
1928 establishments in North Dakota
National Register of Historic Places in Adams County, North Dakota